Westmarch may refer to:

Westmarch (stadium), a defunct football stadium in Paisley, Scotland
Westmarch, a region of the Shire in J. R. R. Tolkien's fictional Middle-earth